The 2012–13 Women's National Cricket League season was the 17th season of the Women's National Cricket League, the women's domestic limited overs cricket competition in Australia. The tournament started on 13 October 2012 and finished on 13 January 2013. For the first time, the tournament included semi-finals, with the top four teams on the ladder advancing. This was repeated on one further occasion, in 2014–15. Defending champions New South Wales Breakers won the tournament for the 15th time after topping the ladder at the end of the group stage and beating Queensland Fire in the final.

Ladder

Fixtures

Round-robin phase

Knockout phase

Overview

Semi Final 1

Semi Final 2

3rd-place play-off

Final

Statistics

Highest totals

Most runs

Most wickets

References

Notes

Bibliography

External links
 Series home at ESPNcricinfo

 
Women's National Cricket League seasons
 
Women's National Cricket League